Eamonn Cooney (died 7 February 1975) was an Irish politician. He was first elected to Dáil Éireann as a Fianna Fáil Teachta Dála (TD) for the Dublin North constituency at the September 1927 general election. He was re-elected at the 1932 and 1933 general elections. He lost his seat at the 1937 general election but was re-elected for the Dublin North-West constituency at the 1938 general election. He did not contest the 1943 general election, but was an unsuccessful candidate at the 1944 general election.

References

Year of birth missing
1975 deaths
Fianna Fáil TDs
Members of the 6th Dáil
Members of the 7th Dáil
Members of the 8th Dáil
Members of the 10th Dáil
Politicians from County Dublin